Gustavo Carvajal Moreno (1939 – 25 February 2017) was a Mexican politician and member of the Institutional Revolutionary Party (PRI), of which he became president. He also served as secretariat of agrarian reform, a senator, and a federal representative.

He was the son of Ángel Carvajal Bernal, who was Governor of Veracruz from 1948 to 1950. 

Carvajal Moreno became president of the PRI in 1979, replacing , where he stayed until Javier García Paniagua took the spot in 1981. That same day, he was named to the cabinet of José López Portillo as secretariat of agrarian reform.

He was elected senator for the state of Veracruz in the LVI and LVII Legislatures of the Mexican Congress from 1994 to 2000. He became a plurinominal deputy for the LVIII Legislature from 2000 to 2003.

References

1939 births
2017 deaths
Mexican Secretaries of the Agrarian Reform
Members of the Senate of the Republic (Mexico)
Members of the Chamber of Deputies (Mexico)
Presidents of the Chamber of Deputies (Mexico)
Presidents of the Senate of the Republic (Mexico)
Presidents of the Institutional Revolutionary Party
Politicians from Veracruz
20th-century Mexican politicians